Heliomeris obscura is a rare Mexican species of flowering plants in the family Asteraceae. It has been found only in a remote area of dry shrublands in eastern Mexico, in the states of Puebla and Veracruz.

It is similar to H. multiflora in several respects, but has very different leaves, broadly egg-shaped or triangular.

References

Heliantheae
Endemic flora of Mexico
Plants described in 1916